The Denton Confederate Soldier Monument was an outdoor Confederate memorial installed in downtown Denton, Texas, in the United States.

Description
The statue depicts an armed Confederate soldier standing on an arch with the inscription, "Our Confederate Soldiers".

History
The monument was funded and erected in 1918 by the Katie Daffan Chapter of the United Daughters of the Confederacy.

The courthouse behind where the monument had stood was named a Texas Historic Landmark in 1970, a National Historic Registry landmark in 1977, and a Texas State Archeological Landmark in 1981.

Vandalism and removal
One local resident, Willie Hudspeth, has been working to remove the memorial since 2000.

The monument was vandalized with the words "This Is Racist" in 2015. On February 1, 2018, Denton County leaders voted 15–0 to keep the statue but add a plaque denouncing slavery and a video kiosk explaining the city's racial history and progress (which was never added or completed). On June 9, 2020, the Denton County Commissioners Court announced a plan to remove the statue from the Courthouse lawn to another location for conservation.

On June 9, 2020, in the wake of the protests following the murder of George Floyd in Minneapolis, Denton County commissioners voted to remove the memorial.

On the morning of June 25, 2020, removal of the statue began just before dawn.

See also
 1918 in art
 Confederate Monument (Fort Worth, Texas)
 List of Confederate monuments and memorials
 List of monuments and memorials removed during the George Floyd protests

References

1918 establishments in Texas
1918 sculptures
2020 disestablishments in Texas
Monuments and memorials in the United States removed during the George Floyd protests
Buildings and structures in Denton, Texas
Confederate States of America monuments and memorials in Texas
Outdoor sculptures in Texas
Sculptures of men in Texas
Statues in Texas
Vandalized works of art in Texas
Statues removed in 2020